Mark Coleman (born 23 December 1997) is an Irish hurler who plays as a left wing-back for club side Blarney, divisional side Muskerry and at inter-county level with the Cork senior hurling team.

Playing career

Scoil Mhuire gan Smál

Coleman first came to prominence as a hurler with Scoil Mhuire Gan Smál in Blarney. Having played hurling in every grade during his time at the school, he usually lined out at midfield on the senior team. On 16 March 2016, he scored nine points as Scoil Mhuire Gan Smál defeated Roscommon CBS by 0-17 to 2-09 to take the All-Ireland title in the third tier Cusack Cup.

University College Cork

After lining out for the University College Cork freshers' team in his first year at university, Coleman was added to the senior team in advance of the 2020 Fitzgibbon Cup. On 23 February 2019, he won a Fitzgibbon Cup medal after lining out at midfield in UCC's 2-21 to 0-13 defeat of Mary Immaculate College in the final.

Coleman played in a second successive Fitzgibbon Cup final on 12 February 2020. Lining out at right wing-back, he ended the game with a second successive winners' medal after the 0-18 to 2-11 defeat of the Institute of Technology, Carlow.

Blarney

Coleman joined the Blarney club at a young age and played in all grades at juvenile and underage levels. On 24 May 2015, he made his championship debut and scored three points from frees in a 2-13 to 0-15 defeat of Kilworth. On 3 October 2020, Coleman scored 0-14 and was named man of the match when Blarney secured the Premier Intermnediate Championship title after defeating Castlelyons by 1-20 to 0-15 in the final. He was also the championship's top scorer with 1-50.

Cork

Minor and under-21

Coleman first played for Cork at minor level in 2015, however, his sole season in the grade ended without success with a defeat by Limerick. On 23 June 2016, Coleman made his first appearance for the Cork under-21 hurling team, scoring 1-2 in Cork's seven-point defeat by Limerick. He also played in Cork's unsuccessful championship campaign in 2017. On 4 July 2018, Coleman won a Munster medal after scoring three points in Cork's 2-23 to 1-13 defeat of Tipperary in the final. On 26 August 2018, he was at centre-back in Cork's 3-13 to 1-16 All-Ireland final defeat by Tipperary in what was his last game in the grade. Coleman was later nominated for Player of the Year.

Senior

Coleman made his senior debut for Cork on 9 July 2016, replacing Stephen McDonnell for the final two minutes of an All-Ireland Qualifier against Wexford at Páirc Uí Rinn. He made his first start in a National League defeat of Clare on 11 February 2017, before making his first championship start later that season in a Munster Championship quarter-final against Tipperary. Coleman was a regular starter for Cork's subsequent championship games, with his performance against Waterford in the semi-final earning him the GAA/GPA Player of the Month award. On 9 July 2017, he won his first Munster medal following a 1-25 to 1-20 defeat of Clare in the final. Coleman ended the season with an All-Star award.

On 1 July 2018, Coleman won a second successive Munster medal following a 2-24 to 3-19 defeat of Clare in the final. He ended the season by being nominated for a second consecutive All-Star Award as well as Young Hurler of the Year.

Career statistics

University

Club

Division

Inter-county

Honours

Team

Scoil Mhuire Gan Smál
 All-Ireland Post-Primary Schools Senior C Hurling Championship (1): 2016

University College Cork
Fitzgibbon Cup (2): 2019, 2020

Blarney
Cork Premier Intermediate Hurling Championship (1): 2020

Cork
Munster Senior Hurling Championship (2): 2017, 2018
Munster Senior Hurling League (1): 2017
Munster Under-21 Hurling Championship (1): 2018

Individual

Awards
 GAA-GPA All-Star Award (1): 2017
 GAA/GPA Player of the Month (1): June 2017

References

External link

Mark Coleman profile at the Cork GAA website

1997 births
Living people
UCC hurlers
Blarney hurlers
Muskerry hurlers
Cork inter-county hurlers